The Cesar is a large coal field located in the north of Colombia in Cesar department. Cesar represents one of the largest coal reserve in Colombia having estimated reserves of 6.56 billion tonnes of coal.

See also 
Mineral industry of Colombia

References 

Coal in Colombia